The 1936 Washington and Lee Generals football team was an American football team that represented Washington and Lee University during the 1936 college football season as a member of the Southern Conference. In their fourth year under head coach Warren E. Tilson, the team compiled an overall record of 4–5 with a mark of 2–2 in conference play, and tying for eighth place in the SoCon.

Schedule

References

Washington and Lee
Washington and Lee Generals football seasons
Washington and Lee Generals football